Beata Jaworska (born April 17, 1994) is a Polish female professional basketball player.

External links
Profile at fibaeurope.com
Profile at eurobasket.com

1994 births
Living people
People from Zielona Góra
Polish women's basketball players
Power forwards (basketball)
Centers (basketball)